Paradossenus is a genus of spiders in the family Trechaleidae. It was first described in 1903 by F. O. Pickard-Cambridge. , it contains 13 species.

Species
Paradossenus comprises the following species:
Paradossenus acanthocymbium Carico & Silva, 2010
Paradossenus benicito Carico & Silva, 2010
Paradossenus caricoi Sierwald, 1993
Paradossenus corumba Brescovit & Raizer, 2000
Paradossenus isthmus Carico & Silva, 2010
Paradossenus longipes (Taczanowski, 1874)
Paradossenus makuxi Silva & Lise, 2011
Paradossenus minimus (Mello-Leitão, 1940)
Paradossenus pozo Carico & Silva, 2010
Paradossenus pulcher Sierwald, 1993
Paradossenus sabana Carico & Silva, 2010
Paradossenus santaremensis (Silva & Lise, 2006)
Paradossenus tocantins Carico & Silva, 2010

References

Trechaleidae
Araneomorphae genera
Spiders of Central America
Spiders of South America